Hendratta Ali is a  geoscientist who does work in hydrology, aqueous geochemistry, exploration geology and equity geoscience. Her home institution is the Department of Geosciences at Fort Hays State University. She was awarded the 2021 Geological Society of America Randolph Bromery award and Fort Hays State University President’s Distinguished Scholar Award. Ali is a native of Cameroon.

Education, career, and research 
Ali received her Bachelors of Science, Masters of Science, and Diplôme d'Étude Approfondie from the University of Yaoundé I, Cameroon. She earned her Ph.D. in Geology and Aqueous Geochemistry from the Boone Pickens School of Geology at Oklahoma State University in 2010 with a dissertation entitled Carbon Cycling and Stable Isotope Evolution in Neutral Mine Drainage.

She worked as an environmental geologist for pedology and hydrogeology for the Chad-Cameroon Pipeline project and freelanced as a technical translator. Her peer-reviewed publications focus on the dissolved inorganic carbon cycling in groundwaters and improving diversity and educational outcomes in the geosciences.

She serves as a Program Director at the National Science Foundation and led a grant IRES: U.S - Cameroon Collaboration Investigating Anthropogenic Perturbations on Carbon Cycling in an Urbanized Tropical Estuary.

Awards 
Ali has received many awards, including:

 2017 Inspirational Educator Award, American Association of Petroleum Geologists
 2017 Rising Star Award, Oklahoma State University 
 2018 Outstanding Educator Award, Society of Exploration Geophysicists
 2020 Presidential Citation for Science and Society, American Geophysical Union 
 2020 President's Award, Association for Women Geoscientists
 2021 President's Distinguished Scholar, Fort Hays State University
 2021 Randolph Bromery Award, Geological Society of America

Leadership roles 
Ali has served in numerous leadership roles in professional geoscience societies. She was the president of the Kansas Geophysical Society and chaired the Women’s Network Committee and the Youth-Education Committee for the Society of Exploration Geophysicists. She also served as a facilitator for ADVANCEGeo Partnerships training. She also served as supervisor for the Fort Hays State University student chapters of the Society of Exploration Geophysicists and American Association of Petroleum Geologists since 2010.

References

External links

Women geologists
Women geochemists
Cameroonian scientists
Year of birth missing (living people)
Living people
Oklahoma State University alumni
Fort Hays State University people